In Colorado, State Highway 50 may refer to:
U.S. Route 50 in Colorado, the only Colorado highway numbered 50 since 1968
Colorado State Highway 50 (1923-1968) north of Colorado Springs, now part of SH 105